Anna Richardson may refer to:

Anna Richardson (abolitionist) (1806–1892), English Quaker slavery abolitionist and peace campaigner, writer and editor
Anna Ryder Richardson (born 1964), British interior designer and television presenter
Anna Richardson (born 1970), English presenter, television producer, writer and journalist
Anna Richardson (politician), Sint Maarten politician